Amélie Coquet (born 31 December 1984, in Hazebrouck) is a French football player who played for RC Lens Féminin. She spent the majority of her career at FCF Juvisy of the Division 1 Féminine. Coquet plays as a midfielder, and won the league with FCF Juvisy in 2005–06. She made seventeen appearances as a French international between 2003 and 2010.

Personal life
Coquet was born on 31 December 1984 in the town of Hazebrouck (in Nord-Pas-de-Calais).
In 2003, she was enrolled at the University of Liévin for studies in Sciences et techniques des activités physiques et sportives (STAP).

She works as a firefighter in Essonne.

Club career

Early career
Coquet began playing for U.S. Coyecquoise at the age of 5 under the guidance of her father and uncle. She remained at the club until June 1998, when a month later she joined U.S. Therouannaise where she played until June 1999. Cercle Athlétique d'Eperlecques was her next destination from July 1999 until October 2001 when she caught local attention and was called up for the Nord-Pas-de-Calais regional team. At this early stages of her career she played as a forward.

Hénin-Beaumont
Following a request from Clairefontaine to join a top level club, Coquet arrives at FCF Hénin-Beaumont in November 2001. She became a midfielder and  contributed to the club's 2002–03 France D2 title.
She made her debut in the Division 1 Féminine (D1) at the 2003–04 season, finishing 7th in the league. That same position was also achieved in the following season.

Juvisy
Coquet signed with FCF Juvisy in July 2005 and won the D1 in her first season at the club (2005–06). In the following season she made her European debut at the 2006–07 UEFA Women's Cup, reaching the quarter-finals of the 2010–11 UEFA Women's Champions League and the semi-finals of the 2012–13 UEFA Women's Champions League.

After eleven seasons playing for Juvisy, including over 250 matches played in all competitions, Coquet and Nelly Guilbert retired from football at the end of the 2015–16 season.

FCF Arras
In December 2016, Coquet came out of retirement to play for Division 2 Féminine side Arras FCF (now Racing Club de Lens Féminin).

International career

Youth
Early in her career while representing the Nord-Pas-de-Calais regional team, Coquet earned her first caps with the under-16 team.
She then moved to the under-19 team, where notably between 2002 and 2003, she won the 2003 UEFA Women's Under-19 Championship, scoring twice in the tournament. She also played for the under-21 team.

Senior
She made her senior international debut on 8 September 2003 in a UEFA Women's Euro 2005 qualification match against Iceland and was named in the French squad for the 2003 FIFA Women's World Cup, where she played 13 minutes against Brazil. She also played matches at 2004 Algarve Cup, 2006 Algarve Cup, 2007 FIFA Women's World Cup qualification and friendly matches, earning a total of seventeen caps and scoring three goals from 2003 to 2010.

Career statistics

Club
Statistics accurate as of 21 September 2016.

International

(Correct as of 1 September 2016)

International goals

Honours

Club
Juvisy
Division 1 Féminine (1): 2005–06

International
France U-19
UEFA Women's Under-19 Championship (1): 2003

References

External links
 
 
 France player profile 
 Player stats  at footofeminin.fr

1984 births
Living people
French women's footballers
Paris FC (women) players
France women's international footballers
2003 FIFA Women's World Cup players
People from Hazebrouck
Women's association football midfielders
Sportspeople from Nord (French department)
Division 1 Féminine players
Footballers from Hauts-de-France
FCF Hénin-Beaumont players
France women's youth international footballers